Count Józef Hauke-Bosak (19 March 1834 in Saint Petersburg – 21 January 1871) was a Polish general in the January Uprising, and commander of the Polish army in Lesser Poland, the closest collaborator of rebellion leader Romuald Traugutt. He fought many successful battles against the Russians in this region. He fled Poland after the Uprising collapsed in 1864. He died in the post of commander of brigade in the French army at Vosges, during the Franco-Prussian war in 1871. 

He was a nephew of Piotr Steinkeller and also cousin to Countess Julia von Hauke, Princess von Battenberg.

See also
Hauke-Bosak family

References

1834 births
1871 deaths
Military personnel from Saint Petersburg
Counts of Poland
Generals of the January Uprising
Polish people of German descent
French military personnel of the Franco-Prussian War